I Hear a Song is the fifth studio album by Australian recording artist Dami Im released on 23 March 2018 by Sony Music Australia. The album is made up of 12 cover songs and 2 original tracks. The album was announced on 16 February 2018 with Im saying “Before you listen to the album it might look like an unusual combination of songs but I recorded every tune with the same desire, which was to share the stories of these amazing women, the most raw and simple way, through a microphone and my fingers on the black and white keys." In April, Im said: "You wouldn't call it like a serious jazz record, but it has that flavour, it has all that vibe that I used to have before this pop thing came along."

The album was supported by the I Hear a Song Tour commencing in April 2018.

Reception

Cameron Adams from news.com.au gave the album 3 out of 5 stars, writing: "While The Carpenters [cover album] made her sound old before her time, this one works well. Jazzy gems from everyone from Beyoncé to Nina Simone to Norah Jones to Bonnie Raitt. Two originals suggest Dami is more down with 'bebop' than 'dance pop' now." David from auspOp gave the album 4 out of 5, saying: "I Hear a Song is a successful outing featuring music that feels genuinely 'Dami'. This is a really cohesive and mature sounding album. It's not about big bold brash tunes, it's more in the subtlety of the arrangements in each song." He called "Come Away with Me" the album highlight.

Track listing

Charts

Weekly charts

Year-end charts

Release history

References

2018 albums
Dami Im albums
Sony Music Australia albums